Villejuif–Léo Lagrange is a station of the Paris Métro, located on Line 7. It serves the commune of Villejuif.

History 
The station opened when Line 7 was extended from Le Kremlin-Bicêtre to Villejuif–Louis Aragon on 28 February 1985. The station is named after Léo Lagrange (1900–1940), a French socialist politician and under-secretary of state for sport, who helped organise the People's Olympiad in Barcelona in opposition to the 1936 Summer Olympics in Berlin and died during the Battle of France. From 1998 to 2000, the station was renovated and redecorated as part of the centenary of the Paris Métro. The station's theme is sports and is decorated with sports exhibits to evoke the atmosphere of a stadium. Various records of the greatest athletes in the history of sports can be found on the walls of the station dating from the 1990s.

In 2019, the station was used by 2,830,893 passengers, making it the 187th busiest of the Métro network, out of 302 stations.

In 2020, the station was used by 1,500,000 passengers amidst the COVID-19 pandemic, making it the 175th busiest of the Métro network, out of 305 stations.

From January 2022, paper ticket booklets (a pack of 10 tickets, known as a carnet) are no longer distributed at this station as part of the first phase of a three-phase plan that will see the discontinuation of paper ticket booklets throughout the RATP network by March 2022.

Passenger services

Access 
The station has an ascending escalator, from the platform to the public thoroughfare on the Avenue de Paris. It also has four staircase exits, which are on both sides of the avenue.

Station layout

Platforms 
Villejuif–Léo Lagrange has a standard configuration with 2 tracks surrounded by 2 side platforms. Since the 2000 centennial anniversary  of the metro, the platforms were renovated and have been decorated with sports motifs. On the walls, you can observe photos, read exploits, and anecdotes or records of the greatest athletes in the history of sport. The records presented, date from the 1990s. Sergei Bubka is a record holder in pole vault, Javier Sotomayor a record holder in high jump, Maurice Greene a record holder of the 100 meters and Alexander Popov a record holder of the 100 meters freestyle.

Other connections 
The station is also served by line 185 of the RATP bus network, v7 of the Valouette bus network, and, at night, by lines N15 and N22 of the Noctilien bus network .

Gallery

References

Roland, Gérard (2003). Stations de métro. D’Abbesses à Wagram. Éditions Bonneton.

Paris Métro stations in Villejuif
Railway stations in France opened in 1985